Heydari, also spelt Haidari, Heidari or other variants, is an Iranian surname. The meaning of Heydari comes from the word for "lion" (Haydar) in Arabic.

People with this surname include:
 Khosro Heydari, Iranian footballer
 Mohammad Heydari, Iranian footballer
Sepehr Heydari, Iranian footballer

Variants 
 Heydary
 Heidari
 Haydary
 Haydari
 Heidary
 Hydari
 Hydary

Iranian-language surnames
Patronymic surnames
Surnames from given names

de:Heidari